RC Armazi is a Georgian semi-professional rugby club from Marneuli, who plays in the Didi 10, the first division of Georgian rugby. Rugby club Armazi was founded in Tbilisi.

Current squad 
2019/2020 squad

Notable former players 

 Irakli Abuseridze
 Irakli Machkhaneli
 Davit Kiknadze
 Vasil Lobzhanidze
 Lasha Tabidze
 Davit Vartaniani
 Irakli Tskhadadze
 Muraz Giorgadze
 Nika Khatiashvili

External links
Armazi Tbilisi

Rugby union teams from Georgia (country)
Rugby clubs established in 2003
Sport in Tbilisi